Pulaski is a city in and the county seat of Giles County, which is located on the central-southern border of Tennessee, United States. The population was 8,397 at the 2020 census. It was named after Casimir Pulaski, a noted Polish-born general on the patriots side in the American Revolutionary War.

History

Pulaski was founded in 1809. It was named after Casimir Pulaski, a noted Polish-born general on the patriots side in the American Revolutionary War.

During the Civil War, after the Union took control of Tennessee in 1862, thousands of African Americans left plantations and farms to join their lines for refuge. The Army set up a contraband camp in Pulaski to help house the freedmen and their families, feed them, and put them to work. In addition, education classes were started.

Shortly after the war ended, in late 1865, Pulaski was the site of Confederate veterans organizing the first chapter of what became known as the Ku Klux Klan, a secret, white supremacist group. Union troops continued to occupy much of the state until 1870. The KKK members often attacked staff of the Freedmen's Bureau, established during the Reconstruction era to help negotiate new labor contracts and assist with changes in society.

In 1870 Martin Methodist College was founded in Pulaski for white students in the area.

During the American Civil War, the vicinity of Pulaski was the site of a number of skirmishes during the Franklin–Nashville Campaign. Union troops occupied the state from 1862, and hundreds of African Americans left plantations even before the Emancipation Proclamation to join their lines. The Army set up a contraband camp in Pulaski to help organize the freedmen and their families with shelter, food, and beginning classes in reading and writing.

In 1863, Confederate courier Sam Davis was hanged in Pulaski by the Union Army on suspicion of espionage.

After the war, in late 1865, six Tennessee veterans of the Confederate Army founded a secret society, later known as the Ku Klux Klan (KKK). This was the first chapter. These men: John C. Lester, John B. Kennedy, James R. Crowe, Frank O. McCord, Richard R. Reed, and J. Calvin Jones established the KKK on December 25, 1865. They created rules for a secret, hierarchical society devoted to suppressing freedmen and their white allies, and maintaining white supremacy.

The white insurgents were determined to fight secretly against the political advancement of freedmen and of sympathetic whites. Chapters of the KKK quickly were organized in other parts of the state and the South. KKK members often attacked their victims at night, to increase the intimidation of threats and assaults. Other incidents of racial violence against blacks also took place. The Pulaski riot was a race riot initiated against blacks that took place in the city in the winter of 1868, following a heated election season.

Martin Methodist College was founded in Pulaski in 1870 as a private college for white students. Martin Methodist College was merged with the UT System in 2021 to become the new campus under the University of Tennessee System. It is now known as University of Tennessee Southern and is a public university.

Geography
Pulaski is located in central Giles County at  (35.195786, -87.034328). The downtown area is on the north side of Richland Creek, a south-flowing tributary of the Elk River.

U.S. Route 31 passes through the center of Pulaski as First Street, leading north  to Columbia and southeast  to Ardmore at the Alabama border. U.S. Route 31 Alternate (E. Grigsby Street) leaves U.S. 31 in the north part of Pulaski and heads northeast  to Lewisburg. U.S. Route 64 passes south of Pulaski on a bypass route; it leads east  to Fayetteville and west  to Lawrenceburg.

Climate

Demographics

2020 census

As of the 2020 United States census, there were 8,397 people, 3,189 households, and 1,746 families residing in the city.

2000 census
As of the census of 2000, there were 7,871 people, 3,455 households, and 2,038 families residing in the city. The population density was 1,200.8 people per square mile (464.0/km2). There were 3,888 housing units at an average density of 593.2 per square mile (229.2/km2). The racial makeup of the city was 70.40% White, 27.06% African American, 0.24% Native American, 0.85% Asian, 0.01% Pacific Islander, 0.23% from other races, and 1.21% from two or more races. Hispanic or Latino of any race were 1.11% of the population.

There were 3,455 households, out of which 26.0% had children under the age of 18 living with them, 37.7% were married couples living together, 18.2% had a female householder with no husband present, and 41.0% were non-families. 37.5% of all households were made up of individuals, and 17.6% had someone living alone who was 65 years of age or older. The average household size was 2.15 and the average family size was 2.82.

In the city, the population was spread out, with 22.1% under the age of 18, 10.2% from 18 to 24, 26.0% from 25 to 44, 22.1% from 45 to 64, and 19.5% who were 65 years of age or older.  The median age was 39 years. For every 100 females, there were 82.4 males.  For every 100 females age 18 and over, there were 78.4 males.

The median income for a household in the city was $27,459, and the median income for a family was $37,219. Males had a median income of $30,400 versus $21,714 for females. The per capita income for the city was $16,751. About 12.7% of families and 18.9% of the population were below the poverty line, including 28.1% of those under age 18 and 17.1% of those age 65 or over.

Transportation

Airport

Abernathy Field is a public-use airport owned by the City of Pulaski and Giles County. It is located three nautical miles (6 km) southwest of the central business district of Pulaski.

Media 
The local newspaper is the Pulaski Citizen.

Education

Pulaski is home to two high schools, Giles County High School and Richland High School (Lynnville). Pulaski is also home to Tennessee College of Applied Technology-Pulaski (TCAT) and to University of Tennessee Southern.

Sports
In 1903, Pulaski was home to the Pulaski Baseball Club, an independent Minor League Baseball team that played in the Tennessee–Alabama League.

Events
The Diana Singing, near Pulaski in Cornersville, is home of the semi-annual Diana Singing, sponsored by the Churches of Christ. The event attracts over 3,000 people to the area in June and September.

Notable people

 Keyes Beech, Pulitzer Prize-winning journalist
 Walter Beech, pioneer aviator, founder of Beech Aircraft and Travel Air Manufacturing; born in Pulaski.
 Bobby Gordon, football player
 Moses McKissack Ⅲ (1879–1952), African American architect, born and raised in Pulaski.
 Wayne Peterson, longtime racecar driver and team owner in NASCAR and the ARCA Menards Series
 John Crowe Ransom (born in Pulaski), winner of National Book Award for poetry (1964)
 Tyler Smith, basketball player, University of Tennessee; played professionally in Europe
 Bo Wallace, former University of Mississippi Rebels three-year starting quarterback
 David Wills, country music singer
 John Frank Wilson (born in Pulaski), Civil War officer, Arkansas and Arizona politician
 Doug Wolaver, horse trainer who won the Tennessee Walking Horse World Grand Championship three times

References

External links

City of Pulaski official website

Cities in Tennessee
Cities in Giles County, Tennessee
County seats in Tennessee
Populated places established in 1809